L. J. Rogers may refer to:

 Leonard James Rogers, British mathematician
 Lesley Joy Rogers, Australian neurobiologist

See also
Rogers (surname)